Valley of the Wolves is a Turkish media franchise created by Osman Sınav, which has obtained high ratings for the television series and one of the highest box office returns in the history of the Turkish cinema for the first film.

Production history
Valley of the Wolves is the original series created by Osman Sınav, which followed a Turkish intelligence agent working under the assumed identity of Polat Alemdar (Necati Şaşmaz) attempting to infiltrate the Turkish mafia. It ran for 97 episodes from 2003 to 2005.

Valley of the Wolves: Iraq 

Valley of the Wolves: Iraq is a controversial 2006 spin-off film directed by Serdar Akar, which follows Polat Alemdar (Necati Şaşmaz) and his team as they go to northern Iraq during the Occupation of Iraq to avenge the death of Turkish soldiers. Its perceived anti-Americanism and anti-semitism generated interest among American and European media and other organizations, such as the Anti-Defamation League.

Valley of the Wolves: Terror

Valley of the Wolves: Terror is a short-lived spin-off television series, which followed Polat Alemdar in his attempts to infiltrate Kurdish separatist militant networks in Turkey. The first episode of the program aired on the night of February 8, 2007 and earned considerable ratings, but the political reflection of the painful issues of Turkey and the violence shown in the first episode triggered a harsh response from RTÜK (Radio and Television Supreme Council). As a result, the series was cancelled after its first episode, creating a controversy about censorship in Turkey.

Valley of the Wolves: Ambush 

Valley of the Wolves: Ambush is the current spin-off television series, which was launched by Pana Film some time after the cancellation of the previous series, and has been running on Show TV since April 20, 2007. It has not faced any responses from RTÜK yet and it attracts high ratings.

The new series deal with the relations between the state, mafia, business circles, and the deep state phenomenon in Turkey. According to the plot, Polat Alemdar decides to wage a vigilante struggle against four powerful Turkish families that control the national economy, helping Ahu Toros, a young businesswoman who lost her father in a conspiracy by the said families. Polat Alemdar's biggest rival is "Alexander the Great" (İskender Büyük), who trails him at all times. Polat marries Ebru Duru and lives happily, but things take a turn for the worse in the ensuing episodes. The two other protagonists are Memati and Abdülhey. Memati is a former specialized mafia (working for Süleyman Çakır at the time) but now Memati is converted into a good person with a brave heart and a patriot like Polat, he always follows Polat's orders. Abdülhey is like Polat, an agent working for Turkey intelligence and serving his country like a real patriot.

The main antagonist arrives after the third season and is named Aron Feller, an ex agent of CIA and working in Turkey (or controlling Turkey in some ways). İskender Büyük is considered like an anti-hero, who also loves his country but has different views from Polat; instead of Aron Feller being the main antagonist. After a long fight-relation against İskender Büyük, Polat finally manages to kill his main enemy İskender Büyük, but he loses his wife Ebru and his little daughter is taken by Aron Feller to be raised as a Christian in the USA. After the death of İskender Büyük, Polat and his team are facing a new wage of enemies, they try to fight against Kurdish terrorism, most notables of which are Lale Zara and Şahmeran, by the same time a new character appears, his name is Ersoy Ulubey, Ersoy wants to take the deep state of Turkey by the "force". His methods are : terrorism and many relations with big familie leaders like Haşim Ağa, İzzet Ağa, Yaşar Ağa etc. He creates a secret fraternity to take upon Turkey, but Polat and his team must now take him down. By the same time, Polat keeps his relations with the "İhtiyarlar" (the Elders), they give him new missions and Polat is chosen as the "protector" of Turkey. After many episodes Polat kills Ersoy and the main antagonist Aron Feller, by this way almost destroying "Gladio". Through upcoming episodes Süleyman Çakır's family returns after 6 years and new character "Kara" is being introduced, he was the "old" Polat Alemdar before Polat Alemdar, he too worked for the Elders. As the series goes on, many new characters are making appearance such as; Beyefendi, Mete Ağır, Memduh Baba, Şeref Zazaoğlu, Mete Aymar etc. In the episode 161 Memati is killed by a mysterious group, the "white hair" of the Elders is killed too by the same mysterious group. Polat and his friends are in shock after Memati's death, they are lost and they cannot take his revenge. The Elders must now choose a new white hair, so Adil Eşrefoğlu is chosen. Adil Bey is the brother of Doğu Eşrefoğlu; Adil, Doğu and Aslan Akbey were the ones who created the secret mission: Kurtlar Vadisi. A new youth team, called the "Regional KGT" came to Turkey to help Polat to finish his mission "Kurtlar Vadisi", planned by the former white hair to be formed. After this Polat had to kidnap Adil Bey. With the help of a technological tool, Adil Bey tells him everything about his past and he also tells him that he used to be like Polat in his youth services. He says that he formed with his brother Doğu Bey the created KGT (a secret intelligence agency in Turkey), he also tells Polat that he was the one who trained Aslan Akbey. Later, it turned out that Sencer, one of the Elders, was the mastermind behind the murders of Memati Baş and the former white-elder. Sencer and Adil Eşrefoğlu were later executed by the order of the Elders. After that, all of the Elders were executed, as they are revealed by the Templars. The youth team's leader, Akif, told Polat that he should be killed because he had some secrets and he meant that if he is killed, it would be the best for the state.

However, it was a plan of Akif and "Hoca" (then foreign minister), they showed Polat as dead to everyone else than them and the new members of the Elders. Polat was chosen as the white hair. Sadly, he can't see his family because he is still "dead". Some time after, Cahit decides to "betray" Polat and join the secret organization Templars. He meets Safiye Karahanlı where he tries to obtain her belief in him. Abdülhey is founded by Hoca in the "house of peace" being sad because of the death of Polat. Cahit meets Margaret Theodora and joins the mysterious group. Later on he will be introduced to Maestro Ronald and inspector Kane. Two members of the Elders were murdered by the Templars, and as time goes on Cahit found that there is someone beyond Maestro Ronald, therefore "Its Majesty" who is the leader of that group. Kara's grandchild has been murdered by Poyraz where Kara seeks for revenge. Polat helps Kara and they finally killed Poyraz. Cahit was contacted by Timur -personal guard of Polat when he was the white hair-, where Polat wanted to surprise him with his presence, but, by mistake, Polat was shot by Cahit. The Templars found out that Abdülhey was the vice-president of the Elders, but still they haven't managed to decode Polat. After the death of inspector Kane, UN member Mr. Key decided to take revenge for the death of his friend where he murders Margaret and many other people. Polat formed a new military team called "Siyah Sancak" (black flag) which will in the future help brotherly foreign countries. Commander of "Siyah Sancak" is Kara. There was meeting meant to be in Cyprus, where "Its Majesty" would be present. Cahit demolished the whole place and happily left with Kara. Suddenly, in episode 229, Abdülhey was killed in an explosion, the bomb was planted in the KGT office. In episode 232 Kara was injected with an Ebola virus. He didn't want to die by a virus injected by his enemies, so he ordered "Siyah Sancak" to be killed as a commander. Mr. Key was finally murdered by Akif. The new Turkish baron is Fehmi Kuzuzade, Fehmi in many occasion tried to form a council in order to rule over Turkey which was later assassinated by Polat himself. New enemies came such as John Smith, Tilki Andrei from the past series, Sagir, Sadık Britani, etc. It was revealed that friend of Safiye, Professor Martin, was another Maestro besides Ronald and he plans to destroy Polat Alemdar's family and kidnap Elif. In episode 233, Ömer died cause of a heart attack in the middle of the pray in the mosque. In episode 244, Nazife was poisoned by professor Martin. Polat was kidnapped by the Templars where he had a chance to talk with "Its Majesty" where he offers Polat to be the ruler of Turkey under the servance of the organisation. Polat escapes and successfully with Cahit, he kills "Its Majesty" and takes his mysterious staff. Polat marries Leyla in episode 262, however, Leyla is killed in an explosion during her honeymoon with Polat in episode 263 .

Muro: Damn the Humanist Inside

Muro: Damn the Humanist Inside is a 2008 spin-off film, directed by Zübeyr Şaşmaz, starring Mustafa Üstündağ and Şefik Onatoğlu as two revolutionaries recently released from prison, who stumble across an illegal organization run by a former friend.

Valley of the Wolves: Gladio

Valley of the Wolves: Gladio is a 2009 spin-off film directed by Sadullah Şentürk, which follows retired security intelligence agent Iskender Buyuk (Musa Uzunlar) as he decides to strike back against his one-time employers by revealing all he knows about Gladio. "It addresses Turkey’s years-long adventure with the deep state and illegal formations nested within the state" and "aims to provide an opportunity for movie fans to closely look at the 'deep gangs' that attempted to stir and divide Turkey with subversive plots," according to Betül Akkaya Demirbaş in Today's Zaman.

Valley of the Wolves: Palestine 

Valley of the Wolves: Palestine is a 2011 spin-off film directed by Zübeyr Şaşmaz, which follows Polat Alemdar (Necati Şaşmaz) and his team as they go to Israel to track and bring down the Israeli military commander who planned and put into force an attack on a Gaza aid flotilla.

Cultural impact

"Kurtlar Vadisi became an instant hit with its references to Turkish politics, its unabashed abuse of social sensitivities on patriotism, and with unprecedented scenes of violence that included assassination and torture on television", Hürriyet Daily News reviewer Emrah Güler. "Not unlike John Woo’s Face/Off an undercover Turkish agent goes through a set of plastic surgeries to infiltrate the mafia, along with a gunman who walks surefooted in this muddy underworld", Güler continues, "the two go through ordeals of every kind for Polat to become the next baron so that he can break them apart." "The hype eventually got so big that the final episodes featured Andy Garcia as the big American mafia boss and Sharon Stone as his wife, eventually lending a kiss to our hero."

Lead character Polat Alemdar (Necati Şaşmaz) "established in the image of a mafia-macho Turkish guy", according to Hürriyet Daily News reviewer Emrah Güler, and was "admired by the unemployed and frustrated young men all over Turkey". Güler describes him as “the Turkish equivalent of 24’s Jack Bauer, entangled in the deep state, disguised as a mafia boss”. "Short and ordinary looking," according to Güler, "Polat has a self-defined sense of justice that included hanging traitors in the city center of Istanbul." "The series had reached such a cult status that many young men officially changed their names to Polat Alemdar", Güler concludes.

The show has been dubbed into Syrian Arabic dialect and proved one of the most popular Turkish drama to be dubbed into Arabic.

Controversies
An episode of Valley of the Wolves: Ambush that depicted Israeli Mossad agents spying inside Turkey and kidnapping Turkish babies was roundly criticized by the Israeli government and media.  The Turkish government's refusal to act on Israeli requests to more strictly censor the show had contributed to a deepening of a row between the two countries, culminating in Turkey's threat to recall ambassador to Israel Ahmet Oguz Celikkol after a controversial diplomatic meeting with Israeli Deputy Foreign Minister Danny Ayalon in January 2010.

See also

Ayrılık
Zahra's Blue Eyes

References

External links 
 www.kurtlarvadisi.com
 www.kurtlarvadisipusu.com
  
 Valley of the Wolves at Instagram
 Valley of the Wolves at Twitter

 
Mass media franchises
Television franchises
Israel–Turkey relations